The following lists events that happened in 2009 in Lebanon.

Incumbents
President: Michel Suleiman 
Prime Minister: Fouad Siniora (until 9 November), Saad Hariri (starting 9 November)

Events 

 In the 2009 Lebanese general election, the American-backed party March 14 Alliance defeated Hezbollah in the polls.

References 

 
Lebanon
2000s in Lebanon
Years of the 21st century in Lebanon
Lebanon